Swinerton is a commercial construction company that provides services in the United States for commercial office, retail, multi-family residential, hospitality, healthcare, education, energy, and the entertainment sectors. The company also provides preconstruction services, including budgeting, scheduling, value management, and planning. Headquartered in San Francisco, California, Swinerton was founded in 1888 and holds California Contractors License No. 92. Swinerton has offices located throughout California, as well as offices in Atlanta, Charlotte, Austin, Denver, Portland, Seattle, Honolulu, and more.

History
Swinerton Incorporated was founded in 1888 by Charles Lindgren. In the late 1800s, Lindgren partnered with Lewis Hicks, a civil engineer who pioneered the innovation of steel-reinforced concrete in buildings.  During the construction of the Fairmont Hotel in San Francisco the Great Earthquake & Fire of 1906 occurred and one of the few buildings to survive was the Fairmont Hotel.

Swinerton also built San Francisco's Ghirardelli Square, as well as one of the first green buildings in the nation, the Weyerhaeuser Headquarters in Federal Way, Washington. Swinerton also develops and has constructed high-rise offices including the San Francisco Centre, Levi's Plaza and the Gap Worldwide Headquarters.

Swinerton Renewable Energy was formed on 2008.  In its first ten years, it built over 3.5 GW of projects and also provides solutions for their long-term operation and maintenance.

Notable buildings and projects

 Fairmont Hotel
 Ghirardelli Square
 Weyerhauser Headquarters
 San Francisco Centre
 Levi's Plaza
 Gap Worldwide Headquarters
 Eel River Bridge
 Coca-Cola Bottling Plant in Oakland, California
 Chrysler Assembly Plant in San Leandro, California
 Western Sugar Refinery
 NASA Sustainability Base
 Chevron Midland Campus, Midland, Texas

References

Further reading
 
 
  
 Hoover's Handbook of Private Companies. p. 467.

External links
Official website
Timberlab website

Construction and civil engineering companies of the United States
Companies based in San Francisco